Lieutenant Alexander Pearson Jr. (November 12, 1895 – September 2, 1924) was a prominent aviation figure in the Army Air Service from 1919 until his death in 1924. He is credited with setting the world speed record in March 1923. Pearson Field in Vancouver, Washington was dedicated in his honor on by order of the Secretary of War Major General John L. Hines on May 7, 1925.

Biography
Pearson was born in Sterling, Kansas on November 12, 1895 and graduated high school in Hutchinson, Kansas. Pearson then moved to Eugene, Oregon where he enrolled at the University of Oregon.

Pearson joined the Army when the United States entered the war in 1917 and later in served the Air Service. .

Pearson served as an Army test pilot and held numerous flight records, including the transcontinental speed record. He lost his life while preparing for the Pulitzer race in Ohio. Flying the Curtiss R-8, a wing strut failed as Pearson attempted to recover from a dive and his plane crashed into the ground at 260 miles per hour near Fairfield, Ohio, killing him instantly.

Legacy
Pearson Field was officially dedicated on September 16, 1925, and to mark the occasion Lt. Oakley G. Kelly organized a large air show. Fifty-six aircraft from across the West converged on Pearson Field, providing the audience of 20,000 a spectacular show of precision flying and parachute drops.

Alexander Pearson Marker located at 45° 37.455′ N, 122° 39.437′ W. Marker is in Vancouver, Washington, in Clark County. Marker is on E. 5th Street, on the left when traveling west. Marker is at the Pearson Air Museum Headquarters Building. Marker created by A. H. Clark in 1938. Made by L. C. Blouhard, J. F. Mahaney.

References

1895 births
1924 deaths
Accidental deaths in Ohio
American aviation record holders
Aviators from Kansas
Aviators killed in aviation accidents or incidents in the United States
University of Oregon alumni
People from Sterling, Kansas
People from Hutchinson, Kansas
Mackay Trophy winners
Burials at Arlington National Cemetery
Victims of aviation accidents or incidents in 1924